Individualism is the moral stance, political philosophy, ideology and social outlook that emphasizes the intrinsic worth of the individual.  Individualists promote the realisation of one's goals and desires, valuing independence and self-reliance, and advocating that the interests of the individual should gain precedence over the state or a social group, while opposing external interference upon one's own interests by society or institutions such as the government. Individualism is often defined in contrast to totalitarianism, collectivism and more corporate social forms.

Individualism makes the individual its focus and so starts "with the fundamental premise that the human individual is of primary importance in the struggle for liberation". Anarchism, existentialism, liberalism and libertarianism are examples of movements that take the human individual as a central unit of analysis.

Individualism has been used as a term denoting "[t]he quality of being an individual; individuality", related to possessing "[a]n individual characteristic; a quirk". Individualism is also associated with artistic and bohemian interests and lifestyles where there is a tendency towards self-creation and experimentation as opposed to tradition or popular mass opinions and behaviors such as with humanist philosophical positions and ethics.

Etymology 
In the English language, the word individualism was first introduced as a pejorative by utopian socialists such as the Owenites in the late 1830s, although it is unclear if they were influenced by Saint-Simonianism or came up with it independently. A more positive use of the term in Britain came to be used with the writings of James Elishama Smith, who was a millenarian and a Christian Israelite. Although an early follower of Robert Owen, he eventually rejected its collective idea of property and found in individualism a "universalism" that allowed for the development of the "original genius". Without individualism, Smith argued that individuals cannot amass property to increase one's happiness. William Maccall, another Unitarian preacher and probably an acquaintance of Smith, came somewhat later, although influenced by John Stuart Mill, Thomas Carlyle and German Romanticism, to the same positive conclusions in his 1847 work Elements of Individualism.

Individual 

An individual is a person or any specific object in a collection. In the 15th century and earlier, and also today within the fields of statistics and metaphysics, individual means "indivisible", typically describing any numerically singular thing, but sometimes meaning "a person" as in "The problem of proper names". From the 17th century on, individual indicates separateness, as in individualism. Individuality is the state or quality of being an individuated being; a person separated from everything with unique character by possessing their own needs, goals, and desires in comparison to other persons.

Individuation principle 

For Carl Jung, individuation is a process of transformation, whereby the personal and collective unconscious is brought into consciousness (by means of dreams, active imagination or free association to take examples) to be assimilated into the whole personality. It is a completely natural process necessary for the integration of the psyche to take place. Jung considered individuation to be the central process of human development. In L'individuation psychique et collective, Gilbert Simondon developed a theory of individual and collective individuation in which the individual subject is considered as an effect of individuation rather than a cause. Thus, the individual atom is replaced by a never-ending ontological process of individuation. Individuation is an always incomplete process, always leaving a "pre-individual" left-over, itself making possible future individuations. The philosophy of Bernard Stiegler draws upon and modifies the work of Gilbert Simondon on individuation and also upon similar ideas in Friedrich Nietzsche and Sigmund Freud. For Stiegler, "the I, as a psychic individual, can only be thought in relationship to we, which is a collective individual. The I is constituted in adopting a collective tradition, which it inherits and in which a plurality of Is acknowledge each other's existence."

Individualism and society 
Individualism holds that a person taking part in society attempts to learn and discover what his or her own interests are on a personal basis, without a presumed following of the interests of a societal structure (an individualist need not be an egoist). The individualist does not necessarily follow one particular philosophy. He may create an amalgamation of elements of many philosophies, based on personal interests in particular aspects that he finds of use. On a societal level, the individualist participates on a personally structured political and moral ground. Independent thinking and opinion is a necessary trait of an individualist. Jean-Jacques Rousseau, claims that his concept of general will in The Social Contract is not the simple collection of individual wills and that it furthers the interests of the individual (the constraint of law itself would be beneficial for the individual, as the lack of respect for the law necessarily entails, in Rousseau's eyes, a form of ignorance and submission to one's passions instead of the preferred autonomy of reason).

Individualism versus collectivism is a common dichotomy in cross-cultural research. Global comparative studies have found that the world's cultures vary in the degree to which they emphasize individual autonomy, freedom and initiative (individualistic traits), respectively conformity to group norms, maintaining traditions and obedience to in-group authority (collectivistic traits). Cultural differences between individualism and collectivism are differences in degrees, not in kind. Cultural individualism is strongly correlated with GDP per capita. The cultures of economically developed regions such as Australia, New Zealand, Japan, South Korea, North America and Western Europe are the most individualistic in the world. Middle income regions such as Eastern Europe, South America and mainland East Asia have cultures which are neither very individualistic nor very collectivistic. The most collectivistic cultures in the world are from economically developing regions such as the Middle East and Northern Africa, Sub-Saharan Africa, South and South-East Asia, Central Asia and Central America.

An earlier analysis by Ruth Benedict in her book The Chrysanthemum and the Sword states that societies and groups can differ in the extent to which they are based upon predominantly "self-regarding" (individualistic, and/or self-interested) behaviors, rather than "other-regarding" (group-oriented, and group, or society-minded) behaviors. Ruth Benedict made a distinction, relevant in this context, between guilt societies (e.g. medieval Europe) with an "internal reference standard" and shame societies (e.g. Japan, "bringing shame upon one's ancestors") with an "external reference standard", where people look to their peers for feedback on whether an action is acceptable or not.

Individualism is often contrasted either with totalitarianism or with collectivism, but there is a spectrum of behaviors at the societal level ranging from highly individualistic societies through mixed societies to collectivist.

Competitive individualism 
According to an Oxford Dictionary, "competitive individualism" in sociology is "the view that achievement and non-achievement should depend on merit. Effort and ability are regarded as prerequisites of success. Competition is seen as an acceptable means of distributing limited resources and rewards.

Methodological individualism 
Methodological individualism is the view that phenomena can only be understood by examining how they result from the motivations and actions of individual agents. In economics, people's behavior is explained in terms of rational choices, as constrained by prices and incomes. The economist accepts individuals' preferences as givens. Becker and Stigler provide a forceful statement of this view:
On the traditional view, an explanation of economic phenomena that reaches a difference in tastes between people or times is the terminus of the argument: the problem is abandoned at this point to whoever studies and explains tastes (psychologists? anthropologists? phrenologists? sociobiologists?). On our preferred interpretation, one never reaches this impasse: the economist continues to search for differences in prices or incomes to explain any differences or changes in behavior.

Political individualism 

Individualists are chiefly concerned with protecting individual autonomy against obligations imposed by social institutions (such as the state or religious morality). For L. Susan Brown, "Liberalism and anarchism are two political philosophies that are fundamentally concerned with individual freedom yet differ from one another in very distinct ways. Anarchism shares with liberalism a radical commitment to individual freedom while rejecting liberalism's competitive property relations."

Civil libertarianism is a strain of political thought that supports civil liberties, or which emphasizes the supremacy of individual rights and personal freedoms over and against any kind of authority (such as a state, a corporation and social norms imposed through peer pressure, among others). Civil libertarianism is not a complete ideology; rather, it is a collection of views on the specific issues of civil liberties and civil rights. Because of this, a civil libertarian outlook is compatible with many other political philosophies, and civil libertarianism is found on both the right and left in modern politics. For scholar Ellen Meiksins Wood, "there are doctrines of individualism that are opposed to Lockean individualism [...] and non-Lockean individualism may encompass socialism".

British historians such as Emily Robinson, Camilla Schofield, Florence Sutcliffe-Braithwaite and Natalie Thomlinson have argued that Britons were keen about defining and claiming their individual rights, identities and perspectives by the 1970s, demanding greater personal autonomy and self-determination and less outside control, angrily complaining that the establishment was withholding it. Historians argue that this shift in concerns helped cause Thatcherism and was incorporated into Thatcherism's appeal.

Anarchism 

Within anarchism, individualist anarchism represents several traditions of thought within the anarchist movement that emphasize the individual and their will over any kinds of external determinants such as groups, society, traditions and ideological systems. Individualist anarchism is not a single philosophy but refers to a group of individualistic philosophies that sometimes are in conflict.

In 1793, William Godwin, who has often been cited as the first anarchist, wrote Political Justice, which some consider to be the first expression of anarchism. Godwin, a philosophical anarchist, from a rationalist and utilitarian basis opposed revolutionary action and saw a minimal state as a present "necessary evil" that would become increasingly irrelevant and powerless by the gradual spread of knowledge. Godwin advocated individualism, proposing that all cooperation in labour be eliminated on the premise that this would be most conducive with the general good.

An influential form of individualist anarchism called egoism, or egoist anarchism, was expounded by one of the earliest and best-known proponents of individualist anarchism, the German Max Stirner. Stirner's The Ego and Its Own, published in 1844, is a founding text of the philosophy. According to Stirner, the only limitation on the rights of the individual is their power to obtain what they desire, without regard for God, state, or morality. To Stirner, rights were spooks in the mind, and he held that society does not exist but "the individuals are its reality". Stirner advocated self-assertion and foresaw unions of egoists, non-systematic associations continually renewed by all parties' support through an act of will, which Stirner proposed as a form of organization in place of the state. Egoist anarchists claim that egoism will foster genuine and spontaneous union between individuals. Egoist anarchism has inspired many interpretations of Stirner's philosophy. It was re-discovered and promoted by German philosophical anarchist and LGBT activist John Henry Mackay.

Josiah Warren is widely regarded as the first American anarchist and The Peaceful Revolutionist, the four-page weekly paper he edited during 1833, was the first anarchist periodical published. For American anarchist historian Eunice Minette Schuster, "[i]t is apparent [...] that Proudhonian Anarchism was to be found in the United States at least as early as 1848 and that it was not conscious of its affinity to the Individualist Anarchism of Josiah Warren and Stephen Pearl Andrews. [...] William B. Greene presented this Proudhonian Mutualism in its purest and most systematic form". Henry David Thoreau was an important early influence in individualist anarchist thought in the United States and Europe. Thoreau was an American author, poet, naturalist, tax resister, development critic, surveyor, historian, philosopher and leading transcendentalist, who is best known for his book Walden, a reflection upon simple living in natural surroundings, and his essay Civil Disobedience, an argument for individual resistance to civil government in moral opposition to an unjust state. Later, Benjamin Tucker fused Stirner's egoism with the economics of Warren and Proudhon in his eclectic influential publication Liberty.

From these early influences, anarchism and especially individualist anarchism was related to the issues of love and sex. In different countries, this attracted a small but diverse following of bohemian artists and intellectuals, free love and birth control advocates, individualist naturists nudists as in anarcho-naturism,<ref>"Los anarco-individualistas, G.I.A...Una escisión de la FAI producida en el IX Congreso (Carrara, 1965) se pr odujo cuando un sector de anarquistas de tendencia humanista rechazan la interpretación que ellos juzgan disciplinaria del pacto asociativo" clásico, y crean los GIA (Gruppi di Iniziativa Anarchica) . Esta pequeña federación de grupos, hoy nutrida sobre todo de veteranos anarco-individualistas de orientación pacifista, naturista, etcétera defiende la autonomía personal y rechaza a rajatabla toda forma de intervención en los procesos del sistema, como sería por ejemplo el sindicalismo. Su portavoz es L'Internazionale con sede en Ancona. La escisión de los GIA prefiguraba, en sentido contrario, el gran debate que pronto había de comenzar en el seno del movimiento""El movimiento libertario en Italia" by Bicicleta. REVISTA DE COMUNICACIONES LIBERTARIAS Year 1 No. Noviembre, 1 1977 </ref>"Les anarchistes individualistes du début du siècle l'avaient bien compris, et intégraient le naturisme dans leurs préoccupations. Il est vraiment dommage que ce discours se soit peu à peu effacé, d'antan plus que nous assistons, en ce moment, à un retour en force du puritanisme (conservateur par essence).""Anarchisme et naturisme, aujourd'hui." by Cathy Ytak  freethought and anti-clerical activists as well as young anarchist outlaws in what came to be known as illegalism and individual reclamation,Parry, Richard. The Bonnot Gang. Rebel Press, 1987. p. 15 especially within European individualist anarchism and individualist anarchism in France. These authors and activists included Oscar Wilde, Émile Armand, Han Ryner, Henri Zisly, Renzo Novatore, Miguel Giménez Igualada, Adolf Brand and Lev Chernyi among others. In his important essay The Soul of Man Under Socialism from 1891, Wilde defended socialism as the way to guarantee individualism and so he saw that "[w]ith the abolition of private property, then, we shall have true, beautiful, healthy Individualism. Nobody will waste his life in accumulating things, and the symbols for things. One will live. To live is the rarest thing in the world. Most people exist, that is all". For anarchist historian George Woodcock, "Wilde's aim in The Soul of Man Under Socialism is to seek the society most favorable to the artist. [...] for Wilde art is the supreme end, containing within itself enlightenment and regeneration, to which all else in society must be subordinated. [...] Wilde represents the anarchist as aesthete". Woodcock finds that "[t]he most ambitious contribution to literary anarchism during the 1890s was undoubtedly Oscar Wilde The Soul of Man Under Socialism" and finds that it is influenced mainly by the thought of William Godwin.

 Autarchism 

Autarchism promotes the principles of individualism, the moral ideology of individual liberty and self-reliance whilst rejecting compulsory government and supporting the elimination of government in favor of ruling oneself to the exclusion of rule by others. Robert LeFevre, recognized as an autarchist by anarcho-capitalist Murray Rothbard, distinguished autarchism from anarchy, whose economics he felt entailed interventions contrary to freedom in contrast to his own laissez-faire economics of the Austrian School.

 Liberalism 

Liberalism is the belief in the importance of individual freedom. This belief is widely accepted in the United States, Europe, Australia and other Western nations, and was recognized as an important value by many Western philosophers throughout history, in particular since the Enlightenment. It is often rejected by collectivist ideas such as in Abrahamic or Confucian societies, although Taoists were and are known to be individualists. The Roman Emperor Marcus Aurelius wrote praising "the idea of a polity administered with regard to equal rights and equal freedom of speech, and the idea of a kingly government which respects most of all the freedom of the governed".

Liberalism has its roots in the Age of Enlightenment and rejects many foundational assumptions that dominated most earlier theories of government, such as the Divine Right of Kings, hereditary status, and established religion. John Locke is often credited with the philosophical foundations of classical liberalism, a political ideology inspired by the broader liberal movement . He wrote "no one ought to harm another in his life, health, liberty, or possessions."

In the 17th century, liberal ideas began to influence European governments in nations such as the Netherlands, Switzerland, England and Poland, but they were strongly opposed, often by armed might, by those who favored absolute monarchy and established religion. In the 18th century, the first modern liberal state was founded without a monarch or a hereditary aristocracy in America. The American Declaration of Independence includes the words which echo Locke that "all men are created equal; that they are endowed by their Creator with certain unalienable rights; that among these are life, liberty, and the pursuit of happiness; that to insure these rights, governments are instituted among men, deriving their just powers from the consent of the governed."

Liberalism comes in many forms. According to John N. Gray, the essence of liberalism is toleration of different beliefs and of different ideas as to what constitutes a good life.

 Philosophical individualism 
 Egoist anarchism 

Egoist anarchism is a school of anarchist thought that originated in the philosophy of Max Stirner, a 19th-century Hegelian philosopher whose "name appears with familiar regularity in historically orientated surveys of anarchist thought as one of the earliest and best-known exponents of individualist anarchism." According to Stirner, the only limitation on the rights of the individual is their power to obtain what they desire, without regard for God, state, or morality. Stirner advocated self-assertion and foresaw unions of egoists, non-systematic associations continually renewed by all parties' support through an act of will which Stirner proposed as a form of organisation in place of the state.

Egoist anarchists argue that egoism will foster genuine and spontaneous union between individuals. Egoism has inspired many interpretations of Stirner's philosophy, but it has also gone beyond Stirner within anarchism. It was re-discovered and promoted by German philosophical anarchist and LGBT activist John Henry Mackay. John Beverley Robinson wrote an essay called "Egoism" in which he states that "Modern egoism, as propounded by Stirner and Nietzsche, and expounded by Ibsen, Shaw and others, is all these; but it is more. It is the realization by the individual that they are an individual; that, as far as they are concerned, they are the only individual." Stirner and Nietzsche, who exerted influence on anarchism despite its opposition, were frequently compared by French "literary anarchists" and anarchist interpretations of Nietzschean ideas appear to have also been influential in the United States.

 Ethical egoism 

Ethical egoism, also called simply egoism, is the normative ethical position that moral agents ought to do what is in their own self-interest. It differs from psychological egoism, which claims that people do only act in their self-interest. Ethical egoism also differs from rational egoism which holds merely that it is rational to act in one's self-interest. However, these doctrines may occasionally be combined with ethical egoism.

Ethical egoism contrasts with ethical altruism, which holds that moral agents have an obligation to help and serve others. Egoism and altruism both contrast with ethical utilitarianism, which holds that a moral agent should treat one's self (also known as the subject) with no higher regard than one has for others (as egoism does, by elevating self-interests and "the self" to a status not granted to others), but that one also should not (as altruism does) sacrifice one's own interests to help others' interests, so long as one's own interests (i.e. one's own desires or well-being) are substantially-equivalent to the others' interests and well-being. Egoism, utilitarianism, and altruism are all forms of consequentialism, but egoism and altruism contrast with utilitarianism, in that egoism and altruism are both agent-focused forms of consequentialism (i.e. subject-focused or subjective), but utilitarianism is called agent-neutral (i.e. objective and impartial) as it does not treat the subject's (i.e. the self's, i.e. the moral "agent's") own interests as being more or less important than if the same interests, desires, or well-being were anyone else's.

Ethical egoism does not require moral agents to harm the interests and well-being of others when making moral deliberation, e.g. what is in an agent's self-interest may be incidentally detrimental, beneficial, or neutral in its effect on others. Individualism allows for others' interest and well-being to be disregarded or not as long as what is chosen is efficacious in satisfying the self-interest of the agent. Nor does ethical egoism necessarily entail that in pursuing self-interest one ought always to do what one wants to do, e.g. in the long term the fulfilment of short-term desires may prove detrimental to the self. Fleeting pleasance then takes a back seat to protracted eudaemonia. In the words of James Rachels, "[e]thical egoism [...] endorses selfishness, but it doesn't endorse foolishness."

Ethical egoism is sometimes the philosophical basis for support of libertarianism or individualist anarchism as in Max Stirner, although these can also be based on altruistic motivations. These are political positions based partly on a belief that individuals should not coercively prevent others from exercising freedom of action.

 Existentialism 

Existentialism is a term applied to the work of a number of 19th- and 20th-century philosophers who generally held, despite profound doctrinal differences,Oxford Companion to Philosophy, ed. Ted Honderich, New York (1995), p. 259. that the focus of philosophical thought should be to deal with the conditions of existence of the individual person and his or her emotions, actions, responsibilities, and thoughts.Cooper, D. E. Existentialism: A Reconstruction (Basil Blackwell, 1999, p. 8) The early 19th century philosopher Søren Kierkegaard, posthumously regarded as the father of existentialism,Stanford Encyclopedia of Philosophy http://plato.stanford.edu/entries/kierkegaard/ maintained that the individual solely has the responsibilities of giving one's own life meaning and living that life passionately and sincerely,Lowrie, Walter. Kierkegaard's attack upon "Christendom" (Princeton, 1968, pp. 37–40) in spite of many existential obstacles and distractions including despair, angst, absurdity, alienation and boredom.

Subsequent existential philosophers retain the emphasis on the individual, but differ in varying degrees on how one achieves and what constitutes a fulfilling life, what obstacles must be overcome, and what external and internal factors are involved, including the potential consequences of the existenceMartin, Clancy. Religious Existentialism in Companion to Phenomenology and Existentialism (Blackwell, 2006, pp. 188–205) or non-existence of God.D.E. Cooper Existentialism: A Reconstruction (Basil Blackwell, 1999, p. 8). Many existentialists have also regarded traditional systematic or academic philosophy in both style and content as too abstract and remote from concrete human experience.Walter Kaufmann, Existentialism: From Dostoevesky to Sartre, New York (1956), p. 12 Existentialism became fashionable after World War II as a way to reassert the importance of human individuality and freedom.

 Freethought 

Freethought holds that individuals should not accept ideas proposed as truth without recourse to knowledge and reason. Thus, freethinkers strive to build their opinions on the basis of facts, scientific inquiry and logical principles, independent of any logical fallacies or intellectually limiting effects of authority, confirmation bias, cognitive bias, conventional wisdom, popular culture, prejudice, sectarianism, tradition, urban legend and all other dogmas. Regarding religion, freethinkers hold that there is insufficient evidence to scientifically validate the existence of supernatural phenomena.

 Humanism 

Humanism is a perspective common to a wide range of ethical stances that attaches importance to human dignity, concerns, and capabilities, particularly rationality. Although the word has many senses, its meaning comes into focus when contrasted to the supernatural or to appeals to authority. Since the 19th century, humanism has been associated with an anti-clericalism inherited from the 18th-century Enlightenment philosophes. 21st century Humanism tends to strongly endorse human rights, including reproductive rights, gender equality, social justice, and the separation of church and state. The term covers organized non-theistic religions, secular humanism, and a humanistic life stance.

 Hedonism 

Philosophical hedonism is a meta-ethical theory of value which argues that pleasure is the only intrinsic good and pain is the only intrinsic bad. The basic idea behind hedonistic thought is that pleasure (an umbrella term for all inherently likable emotions) is the only thing that is good in and of itself or by its very nature. This implies evaluating the moral worth of character or behavior according to the extent that the pleasure it produces exceeds the pain it entails.

 Libertinism 

A libertine is one devoid of most moral restraints, which are seen as unnecessary or undesirable, especially one who ignores or even spurns accepted morals and forms of behaviour sanctified by the larger society. Libertines place value on physical pleasures, meaning those experienced through the senses. As a philosophy, libertinism gained new-found adherents in the 17th, 18th, and 19th centuries, particularly in France and Great Britain. Notable among these were John Wilmot, 2nd Earl of Rochester and the Marquis de Sade. During the Baroque era in France, there existed a freethinking circle of philosophers and intellectuals who were collectively known as libertinage érudit and which included Gabriel Naudé, Élie Diodati and François de La Mothe Le Vayer. The critic Vivian de Sola Pinto linked John Wilmot, 2nd Earl of Rochester's libertinism to Hobbesian materialism.

 Objectivism 

Objectivism is a system of philosophy created by philosopher and novelist Ayn Rand which holds that reality exists independent of consciousness; human beings gain knowledge rationally from perception through the process of concept formation and inductive and deductive logic; the moral purpose of one's life is the pursuit of one's own happiness or rational self-interest. Rand thinks the only social system consistent with this morality is full respect for individual rights, embodied in pure laissez-faire capitalism; and the role of art in human life is to transform man's widest metaphysical ideas, by selective reproduction of reality, into a physical forma work of artthat he can comprehend and to which he can respond emotionally. Objectivism celebrates man as his own hero, "with his own happiness as the moral purpose of his life, with productive achievement as his noblest activity, and reason as his only absolute."

 Philosophical anarchism 

Philosophical anarchism is an anarchist school of thought which contends that the state lacks moral legitimacy. In contrast to revolutionary anarchism, philosophical anarchism does not advocate violent revolution to eliminate it but advocates peaceful evolution to superate it. Although philosophical anarchism does not necessarily imply any action or desire for the elimination of the state, philosophical anarchists do not believe that they have an obligation or duty to obey the state, or conversely that the state has a right to command.

Philosophical anarchism is a component especially of individualist anarchism. Philosophical anarchists of historical note include Mohandas Gandhi, William Godwin, Pierre-Joseph Proudhon, Max Stirner, Benjamin Tucker and Henry David Thoreau. Contemporary philosophical anarchists include A. John Simmons and Robert Paul Wolff.

 Subjectivism 

Subjectivism is a philosophical tenet that accords primacy to subjective experience as fundamental of all measure and law. In extreme forms such as solipsism, it may hold that the nature and existence of every object depends solely on someone's subjective awareness of it. In the proposition 5.632 of the Tractatus Logico-Philosophicus, Ludwig Wittgenstein wrote: "The subject doesn't belong to the world, but it is a limit of the world". Metaphysical subjectivism is the theory that reality is what we perceive to be real, and that there is no underlying true reality that exists independently of perception. One can also hold that it is consciousness rather than perception that is reality (subjective idealism). In probability, a subjectivism stands for the belief that probabilities are simply degrees-of-belief by rational agents in a certain proposition and which have no objective reality in and of themselves.

Ethical subjectivism stands in opposition to moral realism, which claims that moral propositions refer to objective facts, independent of human opinion; to error theory, which denies that any moral propositions are true in any sense; and to non-cognitivism, which denies that moral sentences express propositions at all. The most common forms of ethical subjectivism are also forms of moral relativism, with moral standards held to be relative to each culture or society, i.e. cultural relativism, or even to every individual. The latter view, as put forward by Protagoras, holds that there are as many distinct scales of good and evil as there are subjects in the world. Moral subjectivism is that species of moral relativism that relativizes moral value to the individual subject.

Horst Matthai Quelle  was a Spanish language German anarchist philosopher influenced by Max Stirner. Quelle argued that since the individual gives form to the world, he is those objects, the others and the whole universe. One of his main views was a "theory of infinite worlds" which for him was developed by pre-socratic philosophers.

 Solipsism 

Solipsism is the philosophical idea that only one's own mind is sure to exist. The term comes from Latin solus ("alone") and ipse ("self"). Solipsism as an epistemological position holds that knowledge of anything outside one's own mind is unsure. The external world and other minds cannot be known, and might not exist outside the mind. As a metaphysical position, solipsism goes further to the conclusion that the world and other minds do not exist. Solipsism is the only epistemological position that, by its own postulate, is both irrefutable and yet indefensible in the same manner. Although the number of individuals sincerely espousing solipsism has been small, it is not uncommon for one philosopher to accuse another's arguments of entailing solipsism as an unwanted consequence, in a kind of reductio ad absurdum. In the history of philosophy, solipsism has served as a skeptical hypothesis.

 Economic individualism 
The doctrine of economic individualism holds that each individual should be allowed autonomy in making his or her own economic decisions as opposed to those decisions being made by the community, the corporation or the state for him or her.

 Classical liberalism 

Liberalism is a political ideology that developed in the 19th century in the Americas, England and Western Europe. It followed earlier forms of liberalism in its commitment to personal freedom and popular government, but differed from earlier forms of liberalism in its commitment to classical economics and free markets.

Notable liberals in the 19th century include Jean-Baptiste Say, Thomas Malthus and David Ricardo. Classical liberalism, sometimes also used as a label to refer to all forms of liberalism before the 20th century, was revived in the 20th century by Ludwig von Mises and Friedrich Hayek and further developed by Milton Friedman, Robert Nozick, Loren Lomasky and Jan Narveson.

 Libertarianism 

Libertarianism upholds liberty as a core principle. Libertarians seek to maximize autonomy and political freedom, emphasizing free association, freedom of choice, individualism and voluntary association. Libertarianism shares a skepticism of authority and state power, but libertarians diverge on the scope of their opposition to existing economic and political systems. Various schools of libertarian thought offer a range of views regarding the legitimate functions of state and private power, often calling for the restriction or dissolution of coercive social institutions. Different categorizations have been used to distinguish various forms of libertarianism.Carlson, Jennifer D. (2012). "Libertarianism". In Miller, Wilburn R., ed. The Social History of Crime and Punishment in America. London: Sage Publications. p. 1006. . "There exist three major camps in libertarian thought: right-libertarianism, socialist libertariaism, and left-lbertarianism; the extent to which these represent distinct ideologies as opposed to variations on a theme is contrasted by scholars. Regardless, these factions differ most pronouncedly with respect to private property." This is done to distinguish libertarian views on the nature of property and capital, usually along left–right or socialist–capitalist lines.

 Left-libertarianism 

Left-libertarianism represents several related yet distinct approaches to politics, society, culture and political and social theory which stress both individual and political freedom alongside social justice. Unlike right-libertarians, left-libertarians believe that neither claiming nor mixing one's labor with natural resources is enough to generate full private property rights, and maintain that natural resources (land, oil, gold, trees) ought to be held in some egalitarian manner, either unowned or owned collectively. Those left-libertarians who support property do so under different property normsByas, Jason Lee (25 November 2015). "The Moral Irrelevance of Rent". Center for a Stateless Society. Retrieved 21 March 2020.Gillis, William (29 November 2015). "The Organic Emergence of Property from Reputation". Center for a Stateless Society. Retrieved 8 April 2020. and theories, or under the condition that recompense is offered to the local or global community.

Related terms include egalitarian libertarianism,Sullivan, Mark A. (July 2003). "Why the Georgist Movement Has Not Succeeded: A Personal Response to the Question Raised by Warren J. Samuels". American Journal of Economics and Sociology. 62 (3): 612. left-wing libertarianism, libertarianism, libertarian socialism,Long, Roderick T. (2012). "The Rise of Social Anarchism". In Gaus, Gerald F.; D'Agostino, Fred, eds. The Routledge Companion to Social and Political Philosophy. p. 223. social libertarianism and socialist libertarianism. Left-libertarianism can refer generally to these related and overlapping schools of thought:
 Anti-authoritarian varieties of left-wing politics, in particular within the socialist movement, usually known as libertarian socialism.
 Geolibertarianism, an American synthesis of libertarianism and Georgism.DeCoster, Karen (19 April 2006). "Henry George and the Tariff Question". LewRockwell.com. Retrieved 23 September 2020.
 Left-wing market anarchism, stressing the socially transformative potential of non-aggression and anti-capitalist freed markets.Chartier, Gary; Johnson, Charles W. (2011). Markets Not Capitalism: Individualist Anarchism Against Bosses, Inequality, Corporate Power, and Structural Poverty. Brooklyn: Minor Compositions/Autonomedia. pp. 1–11. .
 Steiner–Vallentyne school, named after Hillel Steiner and Peter Vallentyne, whose proponents draw conclusions from classical liberal or market liberal premises.

 Right-libertarianism 

Right-libertarianism represents either non-collectivist forms of libertarianism or a variety of different libertarian views that scholars label to the right of libertarianism such as libertarian conservatism. Related terms include conservative libertarianism,Narveson, Jan (2001). The Libertarian Idea (revised ed.).  Peterborough, Ontario: Broadview Press. p. 8. . libertarian capitalism and right-wing libertarianism.Goodway, David (2006). Anarchist Seeds Beneath the Snow: Left-Libertarian Thought and British Writers from William Morris to Colin Ward. Liverpool: Liverpool University Press. p. 4. "'Libertarian' and 'libertarianism' are frequently employed by anarchists as synonyms for 'anarchist' and 'anarchism', largely as an attempt to distance themselves from the negative connotations of 'anarchy' and its derivatives. The situation has been vastly complicated in recent decades with the rise of anarcho-capitalism, 'minimal statism' and an extreme right-wing laissez-faire philosophy advocated by such theorists as Rothbard and Nozick and their adoption of the words 'libertarian' and 'libertarianism'. It has therefore now become necessary to distinguish between their right libertarianism and the left libertarianism of the anarchist tradition". In the mid-20th century, right-libertarian ideologies such as anarcho-capitalism and minarchism co-opted the term libertarian to advocate laissez-faire capitalism and strong private property rights such as in land, infrastructure and natural resources. The latter is the dominant form of libertarianism in the United States, where it advocates civil liberties, natural law, free-market capitalism and a major reversal of the modern welfare state.

In the Stanford Encyclopedia of Philosophy, Peter Vallentyne calls it right libertarianism, but he further states: "Libertarianism is often thought of as 'right-wing' doctrine. This, however, is mistaken for at least two reasons. First, on socialrather than economicissues, libertarianism tends to be 'left-wing'. It opposes laws that restrict consensual and private sexual relationships between adults (e.g., gay sex, non-marital sex, and deviant sex), laws that restrict drug use, laws that impose religious views or practices on individuals, and compulsory military service. Second, in addition to the better-known version of libertarianismright-libertarianismthere is also a version known as 'left-libertarianism'. Both endorse full self-ownership, but they differ with respect to the powers agents have to appropriate unappropriated natural resources (land, air, water, etc.)."

 Socialism 

With regard to economic questions within individualist socialist schools such as individualist anarchism, there are adherents to mutualism (Pierre Joseph Proudhon, Émile Armand and early Benjamin Tucker); natural rights positions (early Benjamin Tucker, Lysander Spooner and Josiah Warren); and egoistic disrespect for "ghosts" such as private property and markets (Max Stirner, John Henry Mackay, Lev Chernyi, later Benjamin Tucker, Renzo Novatore and illegalism). Contemporary individualist anarchist Kevin Carson characterizes American individualist anarchism saying that "[u]nlike the rest of the socialist movement, the individualist anarchists believed that the natural wage of labor in a free market was its product, and that economic exploitation could only take place when capitalists and landlords harnessed the power of the state in their interests. Thus, individualist anarchism was an alternative both to the increasing statism of the mainstream socialist movement, and to a classical liberal movement that was moving toward a mere apologetic for the power of big business."

 Libertarian socialism 

Libertarian socialism, sometimes dubbed left-libertarianismHicks, Steven V. and Daniel E. Shannon. The American journal of economics and sociology. Blackwell Pub, 2003. p. 612 and socialist libertarianism, is an anti-authoritarian, anti-statist and libertarian tradition within the socialist movement that rejects the state socialist conception of socialism as a statist form where the state retains centralized control of the economy."So, libertarian socialism rejects the idea of state ownership and control of the economy, along with the state as such. Through workers' self-management it proposes to bring an end to authority, exploitation, and hierarchy in production." "I1. Isn't libertarian socialism an oxymoron" in  An Anarchist FAQ Libertarian socialists criticize wage slavery relationships within the workplace, emphasizing workers' self-management of the workplace and decentralized structures of political organization." ...preferringa system of popular self governance via networks of decentralized, local voluntary, participatory, cooperative associations. Roderick T. Long. "Toward a libertarian theory of class." Social Philosophy and Policy. Volume 15. Issue 02. Summer 1998. p. 305

Libertarian socialism asserts that a society based on freedom and justice can be achieved through abolishing authoritarian institutions that control certain means of production and subordinate the majority to an owning class or political and economic elite. Libertarian socialists advocate for decentralized structures based on direct democracy and federal or confederal associations such as libertarian municipalism, citizens' assemblies, trade unions and workers' councils.

All of this is generally done within a general call for liberty"...what categorizes libertarian socialism is a focus on forms of social organization to further the freedom of the individual combined with an advocacy of non-state means for achieving this." Matt Dawson. Late modernity, individualization and socialism: An Associational Critique of Neoliberalism. Palgrave MacMillan. 2013. p. 64 and free association through the identification, criticism and practical dismantling of illegitimate authority in all aspects of human life."Authority is defined in terms of the right to exercise social control (as explored in the "sociology of power") and the correlative duty to obey (as explred in the "philosophy of practical reason"). Anarchism is distinguished, philosophically, by its scepticism towards such moral relations – by its questioning of the claims made for such normative power – and, practically, by its challenge to those "authoritative" powers which cannot justify their claims and which are therefore deemed illegitimate or without moral foundation."Anarchism and Authority: A Philosophical Introduction to Classical Anarchism by Paul McLaughlin. AshGate. 2007. p. 1Individualist anarchist Benjamin Tucker defined anarchism as opposition to authority as follows "They found that they must turn either to the right or to the left, – follow either the path of Authority or the path of Liberty. Marx went one way; Warren and Proudhon the other. Thus were born State Socialism and Anarchism...Authority, takes many shapes, but, broadly speaking, her enemies divide themselves into three classes: first, those who abhor her both as a means and as an end of progress, opposing her openly, avowedly, sincerely, consistently, universally; second, those who profess to believe in her as a means of progress, but who accept her only so far as they think she will subserve their own selfish interests, denying her and her blessings to the rest of the world; third, those who distrust her as a means of progress, believing in her only as an end to be obtained by first trampling upon, violating, and outraging her. These three phases of opposition to Liberty are met in almost every sphere of thought and human activity. Good representatives of the first are seen in the Catholic Church and the Russian autocracy; of the second, in the Protestant Church and the Manchester school of politics and political economy; of the third, in the atheism of Gambetta and the socialism of Karl Marx." Benjamin Tucker. Individual Liberty. Within the larger socialist movement, libertarian socialism seeks to distinguish itself from Leninism and social democracy."In some ways, it is perhaps fair to say that if Left communism is an intellectual- political formation, it is so, first and foremost, negatively – as opposed to other socialist traditions. I have labelled this negative pole 'socialist orthodoxy', composed of both Leninists and social democrats...What I suggested was that these Left communist thinkers differentiated their own understandings of communism from a strand of socialism that came to follow a largely electoral road in the West, pursuing a kind of social capitalism, and a path to socialism that predominated in the peripheral and semi- peripheral countries, which sought revolutionary conquest of power and led to something like state capitalism. Generally, the Left communist thinkers were to find these paths locked within the horizons of capitalism (the law of value, money, private property, class, the state), and they were to characterize these solutions as statist, substitutionist and authoritarian." Chamsy el- Ojeili. Beyond post-socialism. Dialogues with the far-left. Palgrave Macmillan. 2015. p. 8

Past and present currents and movements commonly described as libertarian socialist include anarchism (especially anarchist schools of thought such as anarcho-communism, anarcho-syndicalism, collectivist anarchism, green anarchism, individualist anarchism,Armand, Émile (1907). "Anarchist Individualism as a Life and Activity". French individualist anarchist Émile Armand shows clearly opposition to capitalism and centralized economies when he said that the individualist anarchist "inwardly he remains refractory – fatally refractory – morally, intellectually, economically (The capitalist economy and the directed economy, the speculators and the fabricators of single are equally repugnant to him.)"Chartier, Gary; Johnson, Charles W. (2011). Markets Not Capitalism: Individualist Anarchism Against Bosses, Inequality, Corporate Power, and Structural Poverty. Brooklyn: Minor Compositions/Autonomedia. Back cover. "It introduces an eye-opening approach to radical social thought, rooted equally in libertarian socialism and market anarchism." mutualism, and social anarchism) as well as communalism, some forms of democratic socialism, guild socialism, libertarian Marxism (autonomism, council communism, left communism, and Luxemburgism, among others),Graham, Robert. "The General Idea of Proudhon's Revolution". participism, revolutionary syndicalism and some versions of utopian socialism.

 Mutualism 

Mutualism is an anarchist school of thought which can be traced to the writings of Pierre-Joseph Proudhon, who envisioned a socialist society where each person possess a means of production, either individually or collectively, with trade representing equivalent amounts of labor in the free market. Integral to the scheme was the establishment of a mutual-credit bank which would lend to producers at a minimal interest rate only high enough to cover the costs of administration. Mutualism is based on a labor theory of value which holds that when labor or its product is sold, it ought to receive goods or services in exchange embodying "the amount of labor necessary to produce an article of exactly similar and equal utility" and that receiving anything less would be considered exploitation, theft of labor, or usury.

 Criticisms 

Plato emphasized that individuals must adhere to laws and perform duties while declining to grant individuals rights to limit or reject state interference in their lives.

German philosopher Georg Wilhelm Friedrich Hegel criticized individualism by claiming that human self-consciousness relies on recognition from others, therefore embracing a holistic view and rejecting the idea of the world as a collection of atomized individuals.“Social and Political Recognition” by Paddy McQueen

Fascists believe that the liberal emphasis on individual freedom produces national divisiveness.

 Other views 
 As creative independent lifestyle 

The anarchist writer and bohemian Oscar Wilde wrote in his famous essay The Soul of Man under Socialism that "Art is individualism, and individualism is a disturbing and disintegrating force. There lies its immense value. For what it seeks is to disturb monotony of type, slavery of custom, tyranny of habit, and the reduction of man to the level of a machine." For anarchist historian George Woodcock, "Wilde's aim in The Soul of Man under Socialism is to seek the society most favorable to the artist, [...] for Wilde art is the supreme end, containing within itself enlightenment and regeneration, to which all else in society must be subordinated. [...] Wilde represents the anarchist as aesthete." In this way, individualism has been used to denote a personality with a strong tendency towards self-creation and experimentation as opposed to tradition or popular mass opinions and behaviors.

Anarchist writer Murray Bookchin describes a lot of individualist anarchists as people who "expressed their opposition in uniquely personal forms, especially in fiery tracts, outrageous behavior, and aberrant lifestyles in the cultural ghettos of fin de siècle New York, Paris, and London. As a credo, individualist anarchism remained largely a bohemian lifestyle, most conspicuous in its demands for sexual freedom ('free love') and enamored of innovations in art, behavior, and clothing."

In relation to this view of individuality, French individualist anarchist Émile Armand advocated egoistical denial of social conventions and dogmas to live in accord to one's own ways and desires in daily life since he emphasized anarchism as a way of life and practice. In this way, he opined that "the anarchist individualist tends to reproduce himself, to perpetuate his spirit in other individuals who will share his views and who will make it possible for a state of affairs to be established from which authoritarianism has been banished. It is this desire, this will, not only to live, but also to reproduce oneself, which we shall call 'activity."

In the book Imperfect Garden: The Legacy of Humanism, humanist philosopher Tzvetan Todorov identifies individualism as an important current of socio-political thought within modernity and as examples of it he mentions Michel de Montaigne, François de La Rochefoucauld, Marquis de Sade, and Charles Baudelaire. In La Rochefoucauld, he identifies a tendency similar to stoicism in which "the honest person works his being in the manner of a sculptor who searches the liberation of the forms which are inside a block of marble, to extract the truth of that matter." In Baudelaire, he finds the dandy trait in which one searches to cultivate "the idea of beauty within oneself, of satisfying one's passions of feeling and thinking."

The Russian-American poet Joseph Brodsky once wrote that "[t]he surest defense against Evil is extreme individualism, originality of thinking, whimsicality, evenif you willeccentricity. That is, something that can't be feigned, faked, imitated; something even a seasoned imposter couldn't be happy with." Ralph Waldo Emerson famously declared that "[w]hoso would be a man must be a nonconformist"a point of view developed at length in both the life and work of Henry David Thoreau. Equally memorable and influential on Walt Whitman is Emerson's idea that "a foolish consistency is the hobgoblin of small minds, adored by little statesmen and philosophers and divines." Emerson opposed on principle the reliance on civil and religious social structures precisely because through them the individual approaches the divine second-hand, mediated by the once original experience of a genius from another age. According to Emerson, "[an institution is the lengthened shadow of one man." To achieve this original relation, Emerson stated that one must "[i]nsist on one's self; never imitate", for if the relationship is secondary the connection is lost.

 Religion 
Pope Leo XIII's letter Testem benevolentiae nostrae condemned 'Americanism', which is associated with individualism. 

People in Western countries tend to be more individualistic than communitarian. The authors of one study proposed that this difference is due in part to the influence of the Catholic Church in the Middle Ages. They pointed specifically to its bans on incest, cousin marriage, adoption, and remarriage, and its promotion of the nuclear family over the extended family.

The Catholic Church teaches "if we pray the Our Father sincerely, we leave individualism behind, because the love that we receive frees us ... our divisions and oppositions have to be overcome"

 See also 

 References 

 Further reading 
 Albrecht, James M. (2012) Reconstructing Individualism : A Pragmatic Tradition from Emerson to Ellison. Fordham University Press.
 
 Dewey, John. (1930). Individualism Old and New.
 
 Gagnier, Regenia. (2010). Individualism, Decadence and Globalization: On the Relationship of Part to Whole, 1859–1920. Palgrave Macmillan.
 
 
 Meiksins Wood, Ellen. (1972). Mind and Politics: An Approach to the Meaning of Liberal and Socialist Individualism. University of California Press. 
 
 Shanahan, Daniel. (1991) Toward a Genealogy of Individualism. Amherst, MA: University of Massachusetts Press. .
 Watt, Ian. (1996) Myths of Modern Individualism. Cambridge: Cambridge University Press. .
 Barzilai, Gad. (2003). Communities and Law.'' Ann Arbor: University of Michigan Press. .

 
Libertarian theory